Delphine Bourson-Drossaert (born 26 April 1969) is a French golfer. She won the European Ladies Amateur in 1991.

Amateur career
Bourson won the 1990 Spanish International Ladies Amateur Championship at El Bosque. At the European Ladies Amateur, Bourson lost a playoff to Florence Descampe of Belgium in 1988, and won the event in 1991, three strokes ahead of Mette Hageman of the Netherlands.

Bourson was a member of the winning French team, with Cécilia Mourgue d'Algue, Caroline Bourtayre, Sophie Louapre, Sandrine Mendiburu and Valérie Pamard, at the 1989 European Ladies' Team Championship in Pals, Spain.

Bourson represented France at the Espirito Santo Trophy with Kristel Mourgue d'Algue twice. In 1990 with Sandrine Mendiburu they finished 6th, and in 1992 with Patricia Meunier-Lebouc they finished 5th. 

She played in the 1989, 1991 and 1993 Vagliano Trophy representing the Continent of Europe.

Amateur wins
1990 Spanish International Ladies Amateur Championship
1991 International European Ladies Amateur Championship

Team appearances
Amateur
European Ladies' Team Championship (representing France): 1989 (winners), 1991, 1993
Vagliano Trophy (representing the Continent of Europe): 1989, 1991, 1993
Espirito Santo Trophy (representing France): 1990, 1992

References

French female golfers
Amateur golfers
1969 births
Living people
20th-century French women